The following is a list of events affecting Canadian television in 1964. Events listed include television show debuts, finales, cancellations, and channel launches, closures and rebrandings.

Events

Debuts

Ending this year

Births 
 April 12 - Mark Camacho, actor and voice actor
 September 2 - Keanu Reeves, actor
 October 14 - David Kaye, Canadian-American actor and voice actor

Television shows

1950s
Country Canada (1954–2007)
CBC News Magazine (1952–1981)
Chez Hélène (1959–1973)
Circle 8 Ranch (1955–1978)
Don Messer's Jubilee (1957–1969)
The Friendly Giant (1958–1985)
Hockey Night in Canada (1952–present)
The National (1954–present)
Front Page Challenge (1957–1995)
Wayne and Shuster Show (1958–1989)

1960s
20/20 (1962-1967)
CTV National News (1961–present)
Elwood Glover's Luncheon Date (1963–1975)
The Forest Rangers (1963-1965)
Flashbook (1962-1968)
The Littlest Hobo (1963-1965)
Magistrate's Court (1963–1969)
Music Hop (1962–1972)
The Nature of Things (1960–present, scientific documentary series)
People in Conflict (1962–1970)
The Pierre Berton Show (1962-1973)
Razzle Dazzle (1961-1966)
Reach for the Top (1961–1985)
Singalong Jubilee (1961–1974)
Take 30 (1962–1983)
Take a Chance (1961-1965)
Telepoll (1961-1965)
Telescope (1963–1973)

Television stations

Debuts

Network affiliation changes

See also 
 1964 in television
 1964 in Canada
 1964 in Canadian music